The Budde–Singer Building is a historic building located in Mount Pleasant, Iowa, United States.  This three story, brick Italianate structure was built in 1882. It replaced a similar building that had been built in 1856 and destroyed in a fire.  Its early Italianate style is unusual for this time period, but it fits into its streetscape with similarly designed buildings, including the neighboring Brazelton House Hotel.  The Budde–Singer Building features round arched windows with brick patterned hoodmolds on the second and third floors, and a bracketed wooden cornice.  The first floor storefront has been somewhat altered, and the exterior of the building has been painted since about 1909.  It was listed on the National Register of Historic Places in 1991.

References

Commercial buildings completed in 1882
Buildings and structures in Mount Pleasant, Iowa
National Register of Historic Places in Henry County, Iowa
Commercial buildings on the National Register of Historic Places in Iowa
Italianate architecture in Iowa